Gene Fowler Jr. (27 May 1917 – 11 May 1998), the eldest son of journalist and author Gene Fowler, was a prominent Hollywood film editor. His work included films of Fritz Lang and Samuel Fuller and movies like Stanley Kramer's It's a Mad, Mad, Mad, Mad World (1963), John Cassavetes' A Child Is Waiting (1963) and Hang 'Em High (1968).

He was also the director of feature films as well as numerous television programs. While the majority of his directorial work is regarded as minor efforts (Leonard Maltin lists only three of his seven features in his compendium), two of his films, I Was a Teenage Werewolf (1957) and I Married a Monster from Outer Space (1958), have gained some critical attention in retrospect.

Gene Fowler Jr. was married to film editor Marjorie Fowler from 1944 until his death. He died in the Hollywood Hills, California of natural causes.

His brother Will Fowler (1922–2004) was a Hollywood screenwriter.

Selected filmography

As editor
 Tales of Manhattan (1942)
 Hangmen Also Die! (1943)
 The Woman in the Window (1944)
 Philo Vance Returns (1947)
 While the City Sleeps (1956)
 China Gate (1957)
 Run of the Arrow (1957)
 A Child Is Waiting (1963)
 It's a Mad, Mad, Mad, Mad World (1963)
 Hang 'Em High (1968)
 Molly and Lawless John (1972)
 The House on Garibaldi Street (1979) (TV)
 Caveman (1981)
 Cracking Up (1983)

As director
 I Was a Teenage Werewolf (1957)
 I Married a Monster from Outer Space (1958)
 Gang War (1958)
 Showdown at Boot Hill (1958)
 The Oregon Trail (1959)
 The Rebel Set (1959)
 Here Come the Jets (1959)
 The Astral Factor (1978) (uncredited)

References

External links

1917 births
1998 deaths
People from Denver
American film editors